"Sex Room" is a hip hop song recorded by Ludacris for his seventh studio album, Battle of the Sexes. The song features Trey Songz, who it was also written by along with Ludacris. It was produced by Kajun and was released as the third single from the album.

Single release and chart performance
"Sex Room" debuted on the Billboard Hot R&B/Hip-Hop Songs chart at number 100 in the April 10, 2010 issue. It was originally supposed to be released to US radio stations on April 20, 2010. However, its release was pushed back to May 18, 2010, for undisclosed reasons.  The single debuted at number 98 on the Billboard Hot 100 and has since reached number 69.

Music video
The music video for "Sex Room" premiered on May 25, 2010 on MTV Jams. The video was directed by Chris Robinson  Ludacris confirmed that the video's plot would be similar that of the plot of the movie The Hangover.

Charts

Weekly charts

Year-end charts

References

External links
 

2009 songs
2010 singles
Ludacris songs
Trey Songz songs
Def Jam Recordings singles
Songs written by Ludacris
Songs written by Trey Songz
Music videos directed by Chris Robinson (director)